The Masked Man is a fictional comic book crime-fighter created by B.C. Boyer and published by Eclipse Comics.  His first appearance was in Eclipse, The Magazine #7 (November 1982).  He was later seen in Eclipse Monthly and his own ongoing series entitled The Masked Man, which ran 12 issues. The character and series was very similar to Will Eisner's The Spirit character.

Fictional character biography

The Masked Man is the alter ego of private eye Dick Carstairs, who takes on the identity of the Masked Man so that his friend Barney McAllister, a reporter, could grab headlines using tales of his crime-fighting adventures.

During his crime-fighting career, Carstairs meets a number of allies and enemies.  Among these is Dan Drekston, a reporter who threatens to reveal the identity of the Masked Man unless he can take Barney's place as Carstairs' companion.  He also encounters Phantom Man, a.k.a. Lenny Winchester, when he saves Carstairs' life.  The Phantom Man is an old man in a blue business suit, fedora, domino mask and gloves (a tribute to Will Eisner's The Spirit). Aphidman (a Spider-Man parody) is another, a high school student named Percy who mistakenly thinks he has superpowers like Spider-Man.  Carstairs also meets Maggie Brown, who was blinded by gunfire; after saving her life, Carstairs falls in love with Maggie, although Barney believes Maggie is faking her blindness.  Barney also meets Carstairs' sister, Roxy Chicago, a criminal and murderer.

Bibliography
Eclipse Magazine #7 (November 1982) to #8 (January 1983)
Eclipse Monthly #1 (August 1983) to #10 (July 1984)
The Masked Man #1 (December 1984) to #12 (April 1988)

Notes and references

External links
International hero The Masked Man Page
Comic Book DB page

Eclipse Comics characters
Eclipse Comics titles